Version 3.0 is the third studio album by Canadian singer Marie-Mai. The album was produced by Fred St-Gelais. The album received platinum certification on 1 February 2011 for more than 80,000 copies sold.

Track listing

Personnel
 Marie-Mai – vocals, composer
 Fred St-Gelais - producer, guitar, bass, keyboard, percussion, drum, programming, mixing, mastering, arrangement
 John Nathaniel - production assistant, programming, digital publishing, composer, producer, mixing
 Maxime Lalanne – drum, programming
 Rob Wells – arrangement, composer, keyboard, programming
 Eric Speed - composer, producer, mixing, violin
 Robert Langlois – bass
 Étienne Ratthé - orchestration, cello
 Véronica Thomas - violin
 Pascale Gagnon – violin
 Ligia Paquin – alto

References 

Marie-Mai albums
2009 albums